Josephine Ann Tewson (26 February 1931 – 18 August 2022) was an English actress, best known for her roles in British television sitcoms, such as Edna Hawkins ("Mrs H") in Shelley, Elizabeth "Liz" Warden in Keeping Up Appearances (1990–1995), and Miss Davenport in Last of the Summer Wine (2003–2010).

Early life and education
Tewson was born in Hampstead, London on 26 February 1931. Her father, William, was a professional musician and played the double bass in the BBC Symphony Orchestra; her mother, Kate (née Morley, born 1908), was a nurse, the daughter of Haydn Morley who captained Sheffield Wednesday in the 1890 FA Cup Final. After grammar school, Tewson studied at the Royal Academy of Dramatic Art from which she graduated in 1952.

Early career
A regular comedy performer in sketches featuring Ronnie Corbett and Ronnie Barker on David Frost on Sunday and Hark at Barker (1969), she later appeared in Mostly Monkhouse, a BBC Radio Comedy programme with David Jason supporting Bob Monkhouse. She also appeared a few times in Z-Cars (1963–69) and The Charlie Drake Show (1968). Tewson played Edna Hawkins (usually referred to as "Mrs H" by Shelley) in the first six series of the British sitcom Shelley (1979–82). Later, she played Jane Travers in Ronnie Barker's sitcom Clarence (1988), which he also wrote, and was his last starring television role before his retirement.

Tewson was featured with John Inman in Odd Man Out (1977), an unsuccessful sitcom in which they played adult half-siblings who had recently met. She was rumoured to be Inman's cousin, though she has denied this idea in several interviews. She appeared in the 1984 children's film Gabrielle and the Doodleman as the characters Mrs. Briggs (Gabrielle's father's housekeeper) and the Fairy Godmother.

Tewson was well-known in England for her role as Elizabeth Warden, neighbour and reluctant confidante of social wannabe Hyacinth Bucket in Keeping Up Appearances. Tewson appeared in nearly every episode for the 5 series run, providing a counter to "Mrs Bucket".

Later career
Tewson appeared semi-regularly as Miss Davenport in Last of the Summer Wine (2003–2010), a series written by Roy Clarke who also wrote Keeping Up Appearances. She also appeared in two episodes of the documentary series Comedy Connections, talking about her work in Keeping Up Appearances (2004) and opposite The Two Ronnies (2005). In 2009, she played the role of Iris in the radio drama Leaves in Autumn written by Susan Casanove, produced by the Wireless Theatre Company.

Other television appearances were in an episode of Heartbeat ("Closing The Book", 2002) and as the competition judge, Samantha Johnstone, in an episode in the mystery drama Midsomer Murders ("Judgement Day", 2000). She was featured in two episodes of Doctors as kleptomaniac, Audrey Wilson, ("Now You See It...", 2009) and as Marjorie Page, a woman in the early stages of Alzheimer's disease ("The Bespectacled Bounder", 2012). Tewson played a school teacher in a Sugar Puffs "I Want My Honey" advert during the late 1980s/early 1990s. Tewson played a nanny in a 30-second commercial for Nabisco Fruit Newtons, first aired in 1997 in the United States. 

In 2012, Tewson launched her one-woman show, Still Keeping Up Appearances?, and toured across the UK until early 2019.

Personal life and death
Tewson was married to actor Leonard Rossiter from 1958 until their divorce in 1961. She later married Henry Newman in 1972, who died in 1980.

Tewson died at Denville Hall, a retirement home in London for actors, on 18 August 2022, aged 91.

Filmography

Film

Television

Theatre roles

Radio

References

External links
 
 Dan Abramson "An Interview With Josephine Tewson, Britcoms.com, n.d. 
 Josephine Tewson in radio play Leaves In Autumn
 

1931 births
2022 deaths
Actresses from London
Alumni of RADA
British comedy actresses
English film actresses
English radio actresses
English stage actresses
English television actresses
People from Hampstead
20th-century English actresses
21st-century English actresses